The 2002 IAAF Grand Prix Final was the eighteenth edition of the season-ending competition for the IAAF Grand Prix track and field circuit, organised by the International Association of Athletics Federations. It was held on 14 September at the Stade Sébastien Charléty in Paris, France. Paris became the third city to host the event for a second time, following Rome and Fontvieille.

Hicham El Guerrouj (1500 metres) and Marion Jones (100 metres) were the overall points winners of the tournament. Both athletes took their second career win in the series, El Guerrouj becoming the third man to achieve the feat and Jones the second woman. A total of 18 athletics events were contested, ten for men and eight for women.

This was the last IAAF Grand Prix Final to be staged, the competition being replaced by the IAAF World Athletics Final in 2003.

Medal summary

Men

Women

References

IAAF Grand Prix Final. GBR Athletics. Retrieved on 2015-01-17.

External links
IAAF Grand Prix Final archive from IAAF

Grand Prix Final
Grand Prix Final
International athletics competitions hosted by France
Athletics in Paris
IAAF Grand Prix Final
IAAF Grand Prix Final
IAAF Grand Prix Final
International sports competitions hosted by Paris